The 2013 Carrs/Safeway Great Alaska Shootout was the 35th Great Alaska Shootout, the annual college basketball tournament in Anchorage, Alaska that features colleges from all over the United States. The event is scheduled from November 27 through November 30, 2013, with eight colleges and universities participating in the men's tournament and four universities participating in the women's tournament. Most of the games in the men's tournament were televised on the CBS Sports Network.

Brackets

Men's

Women's

References

External links
 Great Alaska Shootout official site 

Great Alaska Shootout
Great Alaska Shootout
Great Alaska Shootout
Great Alaska Shootout
Great Alaska Shootout